

Sir James Edward Smith (2 December 1759 – 17 March 1828) was an English botanist and founder of the Linnean Society.

Early life and education 

Smith was born in Norwich in 1759, the son of a wealthy wool merchant. He displayed a precocious interest in the natural world. During the early 1780s he enrolled in the medical course at the University of Edinburgh where he studied chemistry under Joseph Black and natural history under John Walker. He then moved to London in 1783 to continue his studies. Smith was a friend of Sir Joseph Banks, who was offered the entire collection of books, manuscripts and specimens of the Swedish natural historian and botanist Carl Linnaeus following the death of his son Carolus Linnaeus the Younger. Banks declined the purchase, but Smith bought the collection for the bargain price of £1,000. The collection arrived in London in 1784, and in 1785 Smith was elected Fellow of the Royal Society.

Academic career 
Between 1786 and 1788, Smith made the grand tour through the Netherlands, France, Italy and Switzerland visiting botanists, picture galleries and herbaria. He founded the Linnean Society of London in 1788, becoming its first President, a post he held until his death. He returned to live in Norwich in 1796 bringing with him the entire Linnean Collection. His library and botanical collections acquired European fame and were visited by numerous entomologists and botanists from the entire Continent. In 1792, he was elected a foreign member of the Royal Swedish Academy of Sciences. 

In 1796, he was elected a member of the American Philosophical Society.

Smith spent the remaining thirty years of his life writing books and articles on botany. His books included Flora Britannica and The English Flora (4 volumes, 1824 – 1828). He contributed 3,348 botanical articles to Rees's Cyclopædia between 1808 and 1819, following the death of Rev. William Wood, who had started the work. In addition, he contributed 57 biographies of botanists. 

He contributed seven volumes to the major botanical publication of the eighteenth century, Flora Graeca, the publications begun by John Sibthorp. A fruitful collaboration was found through descriptions Smith supplied to publisher and illustrator, James Sowerby with whom he subsequently developed as passionate interest in mosses and lichens. Depiction of flora in England had previously only found patronage for aesthetic concerns, but an interest in gardening and natural history saw illustrated publications, such as the exotic A Specimen of the Botany of New Holland and James Sowerby's 36-volume English Botany, reach new audiences.

In 1797, Smith published The Natural History of the Rarer Lepidopterous Insects of Georgia, the earliest book on North American insects. It included the illustrations and notes of John Abbot, with descriptions of new species by Smith based on Abbot's drawings.

Smith's friendship with William Roscoe (after whom he named the genus Roscoea) saw him contribute 5000 plants, between 1806 and 1817, to supplement the Roylean Herbarium. This was to become the Smith Herbarium held by the Liverpool Botanical Garden.

Personal life and death 
Smith died at his Norwich home in Surrey Street on March 17, 1828, aged 68. After his death the Linnean Collection, together with Smith's own collections, were bought by the Linnean Society for £3,000.

He was married to Pleasance Reeve, who survived her husband by 49 years and edited his memoirs and correspondence. They are buried together at St Margaret's, Lowestoft. His niece, Frances Catherine Barnard (1796–1869), was an author.

Works
Icones pictae plantarum rariorum descriptionibus et observationibus illustratae.  London, 1790–93
Linnaeus, Carl von, Disquisitio de sexu plantarum. (1786) –  (English) A dissertation on the sexes of plants translated from the Latin of Linnaeus by James Edward Smith. London : Printed for the author, and sold by George Nicol ..., (book details: xv, [1], 62, [2] p. ; 22 cm. (8vo))
"Tentamen Botanicum de Filicum Generibus Dorsiferarum", Mém. Acad. Roy. Sci. Turin, vol. 5 (1793) 401–422; one of the earliest scientific papers on fern taxonomy Available online on Project Gutenberg.
English Botany: Or, Coloured Figures of British Plants, with their Essential Characters, Synonyms and Places of Growth, descriptions supplied by Smith, was issued as a part work over 23 years until its completion in 1813. This work was issued in 36 volumes with 2,592 hand-coloured plates of British plants. Published and illustrated by James Sowerby.
Linné, Carl von, Lachesis Lapponica or A Tour in Lapland, Translated by James Edward Smith (1811). London: White and Cochrane In two volumes (Volume 1; Volume 2).Tracts Relating to Natural History: published in London in 1798. A collection of essays concerning Linnaeus and botany.

Eponymy

The Himalayan spruce, Picea smithiana'' is named for him.

See also
 :Category:Taxa named by James Edward Smith

References

Further reading
Margot Walker, Sir James Edward Smith, 1759–1828. London: 1988

External links
 Smith Collections at the Linnean Society of London

 
 
Lady Smith 

British pteridologists
British taxonomists
1759 births
1828 deaths
Bryologists
English entomologists
English mycologists
English taxonomists
Fellows of the Royal Society
Presidents of the Linnean Society of London
Members of the Royal Swedish Academy of Sciences
Alumni of the University of Edinburgh
Scientists from Norwich
British non-fiction writers
18th-century English writers
18th-century English male writers
19th-century English writers
18th-century British botanists
19th-century British botanists
Male non-fiction writers
Writers from Norwich
English botanists